Seven ships of the British Royal Navy have been called HMS Protector:

 , a 44-gun fifth rate listed in 1749 that served in India and was wrecked  on 1 January 1776 by a cyclone near Pondicherry.
 Protector, a fireship in service in 1758.
 , a 178-ton, 12-gun brig launched on 1 February 1805. Converted to a survey ship in 1817, she was sold for breaking up in 1833.
 Protector, a  laid down at Portsmouth in 1861 and cancelled on 12 December 1863.
 , a net layer launched in 1936 and converted to an Antarctic patrol ship in 1955. Sold in 1970 for breaking up.
  , a patrol vessel launched as the commercial vessel Seaforth Saga in 1975, purchased by the Royal Navy in 1983 and sold in 1987.

See also
  was launched at Rotherhithe for the British East India Company as a warship to deter pirates and the French Company in Indian waters. A monsoon wrecked her in 1761 while she lay at anchor in Pondicherry Roads.
 , ships of the Royal Australian Navy
 , a former naval base of the Royal Canadian Navy
 , a ship of the Royal Canadian Navy
 , a cutter of the UK Border Force

References
 

Royal Navy ship names